FCSC may refer to:

 Foreign Claims Settlement Commission, a United States quasi-judicial agency that adjudicates claims of U.S. nationals against foreign governments
 Federal Civil Service Commission (Nigeria), an executive agency responsible for managing civil servants in Nigeria